NA-74 Gujranwala-I is a constituency for the National Assembly of Pakistan. It encompasses Gujranwala Cantonment and, moreover, the towns of Qila Didar Singh and Ludhewala Warraich. Additionally, it includes portions of the Gujranwala Saddar Tehsil, Gujranwala City Tehsil and the Municipality of Gujranwala.

Members of Parliament

2018-2022: NA-80 Gujranwala-II

Election 2002 

General elections in Gujranwala were held on 10 October 2002. Chaudhry Shahid Akram Bhinder of PML-Q won by 29,375 votes.

Election 2008 

General elections were held on 18 February 2008. Chauhary Mehmood Bashir of PML-N won by 48,701 votes.

Election 2013 

General elections were held on 11 May 2013. Chauhary Mehmood Bashir of PML-N won by 104,638 votes and became the  member of National Assembly.

Election 2018 

General elections were held on 25 July 2018.

See also
NA-73 Wazirabad
NA-75 Gujranwala-II

References

External links
 Election result's official website

NA-097